This is a list of notable statues worldwide, past and present.

Algeria 

 Ain El Fouara Fountain, Setif
 Constantine statue, Constantine
 Dihya statue, Khenchela
 Oruç Reis statue, Aïn Témouchent
 Shoshenq statue, Tizi Ouzou

Australia 

 Dog on the Tuckerbox, five miles (8 km) from Gundagai
 Burke and Wills statue, Melbourne
 South African War Memorial, Adelaide
 Map the Miner, Kapunda, South Australia

Austria 
 Statues in facades of the Kunsthistorisches Museum - the Art History Museum and Naturhistorisches Museum - Museum of Natural History of Vienna, Maria-Theresien-Platz, Vienna.
 Maria Theresa Memorial, Maria-Theresien-Platz, Vienna, between the Kunsthistorisches Museum and the Naturhistorisches Museum. Sculpted by Kaspar von Zumbusch and unveiled in 1888.  
 Gerard van Swieten statue on the memorial to Maria Theresa.
 Field marshal von Laudon, Field marshal von Daun, Field marshal von Traun, and Field marshal von Khevenhüller on the memorial to Maria Theresa. 
 Archduke Karl by Anton Dominik Fernkorn at the Heldenplatz, 1859. The equestrian sculpture is insofar a miracle which stands for Fernkorn's craftsmanship as a sculptor, as only the two back legs of the horse have a connection with the pedestal, it is only the second oldest in the world of this kind, after the Monument to Nicholas I in Saint Petersburg, outdoing the achievement of Tacca's equestrian sculpture of Philip IV in Madrid.
 Prince Eugen by Anton Dominik Fernkorn at the Heldenplatz, 1865.
 Archduke Albrecht by Kaspar von Zumbusch in front of the Albertina, 1899.
 General Radetzky by Kaspar von Zumbusch in the Ringstraße, 1891.
 Statue of Nicholas, Count of Salm, plaza of the Rathaus, Vienna.
 Statues of Schönbrunn Palace, Gloriette Garden, Vienna.

Belgium 
 Ambiorix, in Tongres
 Manneken Pis, in Brussels
 Butte du Lion ("Hillock of the Lion", "Lion's Mound") in Waterloo
 Godfrey of Bouillon, Royal Square, in Brussels.
 Baldwin I of Constantinople, Flanders Square, in Brussels.
 Léopold II, in Brussels.
 Albert I at Kunstberg.
 Charlemagne, in Liège.

Bolivia 
Cristo de la Concordia in Cochabamba

Brazil 
Christ the Redeemer

Cambodia
Norodom Sihanouk Memorial
Preah Thong Neang Neak Statue

Canada

Manitoba
Louis-Riel by Miguel Joyal

Newfoundland and Labrador
The Dead Christ
The Veiled Virgin

Ontario

Timothy Eaton statue - Royal Ontario Museum
Henry Moore sculptures in front of Toronto City Hall and Art Gallery of Ontario
 Statue of Winston Churchill near Nathan Phillips Square, Toronto
 Statue of Sir Adam Beck on University Avenue in Toronto
 Queen's Park, Toronto
 George Brown, one of the Fathers of Confederation
 King George V moved from Delhi, India in 1969
 Sir John A. Macdonald, first Prime Minister of Canada
 William Lyon Mackenzie, leader of the Upper Canada Rebellion
 Sir Oliver Mowat, third Premier of Ontario
 John Graves Simcoe, first Lieutenant-Governor of Ontario
 Queen Victoria
 Sir James Pliny Whitney, sixth Premier of Ontario
 Ontario Veterans Memorial
 Queen Elizabeth II Rose Gardens in honour of Her Majesty's Silver Jubilee in 1977 and Golden Jubilee in 2002
 Parliament Hill, Ottawa
 Queen Victoria - located north of the West Block; sculpted by Louis-Philippe Hébert (1900)
 Alexander Mackenzie - located west of the Centre Block; sculpted by Louis-Philippe Hébert (1901)
 Henry Albert Harper / Galahad - located outside the Queen's Gates, facing Centre Block; sculpted by Ernest Wise Keyser (1905)
 George Brown - located west of the Centre Block; sculpted by George William Hill (1913)
 Robert Baldwin and Sir Louis-Hippolyte Lafontaine - located east of the Centre Block; sculpted by Walter Seymour Allward (1914)
 Sir Wilfrid Laurier - located south of the East Block; sculpted by Joseph-Émile Brunet (1922)
 Sir Robert Laird Borden - located west of the West Block; sculpted by Frances Loring (1957)
 Queen Elizabeth II - located east of the Centre Block; sculpted by Jack Harman (1977)
 John Diefenbaker - located north of the West Block; sculpted by Leo Mol (1985)
 Lester Bowles Pearson - located north of the West Block; sculpted by Danek Mozdzenski (1989)
 Sir George-Étienne Cartier - located west of the Centre Block; sculpted by Louis-Philippe Hébert
 The Famous Five - depicts the women's suffrage movement (Nellie McClung, Irene Parlby, Emily Murphy, Louise McKinney and Henrietta Muir Edwards); sculpted by Barbara Paterson; the monument is featured on the reverse of the current $50 banknote by various sculptors
 Sir John A. Macdonald - located east of the Centre Block; sculpted by Louis-Philippe Hébert
 William Lyon Mackenzie King - located north of the East Block; sculpted by Raoul Hunter
 Thomas D'Arcy McGee - located north of the Centre Block; sculpted by George William Hill

Saskatchewan
Sir John A. Macdonald statue

China
Spring Temple Buddha in Henan 
 Terracotta army in Xi'an

Colombia 
 Vargas Swamp Lancers
 India Catalina
 Monument to Effort

Denmark 
 Frederik V on Horseback by Jacques Saly
 The Little Mermaid by Edvard Eriksen
 Christus at Church of Our Lady, Copenhagen by Bertel Thorvaldsen

East Timor 
 Cristo Rei of Dili, Dili

Ecuador 
 The Madonna of El Panecillo, Quito

Egypt 

 Great Sphinx of Giza
 Abu Simbel

France 
The Vimy Memorial, honouring Canada's role there in the First World War
The Burghers of Calais by Auguste Rodin in Calais
The Thinker by Auguste Rodin in Paris
The Lion of Belfort by Frédéric Bartholdi in Belfort
Venus de Milo, ancient Greek statue in the Louvre
Winged Victory of Samothrace, ancient Greek statue also in the Louvre
Statue of Liberty (Jardin du Luxembourg) by Frédéric Bartholdi on the Île aux Cygnes in Paris
Jeanne d'Arc in the Rue de Rivoli by Emmanuel Frémiet.
Jeanne d'Arc in front of the Basilique du Sacré-Cœur by Hippolyte Lefèbvre, 1927.
King Louis IX in front of the Basilique du Sacré-Cœur by Hippolyte Lefèbvre, 1927.
Ferdinand Foch near the Trocadéro.
Joseph Joffre in front of École Militaire.
Charlemagne (Charlemagne et ses Leudes) by Charles and Louis Rochet in front of the Cathédrale Notre-Dame de Paris, 1882.
Albert I of Belgium near the Place de la Concorde.
King Henri IV by François-Frédéric Lemot on the Pont Neuf.*Étienne Marcel by Antonin Idrac near the Hôtel de Ville.
Marble equestrian statue of King Louis XIII at Place des Vosges. Begun in 1816 by Louis Dupaty, completed in 1821 by Jean-Pierre Cortot.
General Lafayette at Cours la Reine by 
Paul Wayland Bartlett.
King Louis XIV in front of Louvre Pyramid.
King Louis XIV by François Joseph Bosio at the Place des Victoires, 1822.
José de San Martín in the Parc Montsouris.
King Edward VII by Paul Landowski at Place Edouard VII.
Napoléon Bonaparte at Champs-Élysées.
Simón Bolívar at Pont Alexandre-III.

Georgia 
 Kartlis Deda by Elguja Amashukeli

Germany 
 Bavaria, a statue as symbol of the South German kingdom of Bavaria in Munich
 Victory Column, a statue of Victoria, the goddess of victory, in Berlin
 Bismarck Monument, a statue of Otto von Bismarck, in Hamburg
 Hermannsdenkmal, a statue of Arminius, victor of the Battle of the Teutoburg Forest
 Niederwalddenkmal, a statue of Germania, as symbol of Germany, close to Rüdesheim
King Friedrich II by Christian Daniel Rauch in the Unter den Linden.
King Friedrich Wilhelm IV by Alexander Calandrelli in front of the Alte Nationalgalerie.
National Monument (Emperor Wilhelm I Monument) by Reinhold Begas in front of the Berlin City Palace, 1897, destroyed.
Emperor Wilhelm I by Albert Moritz Wolff at the Hohenzollernplatz in Rixdorf, 1902, destroyed in 1944.
Emperor Wilhelm I by Franz Dorrenbach in the Neuendorfer Straße in Spandau.
Emperor Friedrich III by Rudolf Maison, in front of Bode Museum, 1904, destroyed in 1950s.
Saint George defeats the Dragon
Statue of Sleeping Beauty in Wuppertal, Germany

Greece 
 Statue of Zeus at Olympia, one of the Seven Wonders of the Ancient World sculpted by Pheidias. (Relocated to Constantinople in 393, later destroyed by fire in 462)
 Colossus of Rhodes, one of the Seven Wonders of the Ancient World. (destroyed by earthquake in 224 BC, and the remains sold for scrap in 656)
 Athena Promachos, was a colossal bronze statue of the Greek goddess Athena which stood between the Propylaea and the Parthenon on the Acropolis of Athens, sculpted by Pheidias.
 Athena Parthenos, was a massive chryselephantine sculpture of the Greek goddess Athena which stood inside the Parthenon on the Acropolis of Athens, sculpted by Pheidias.
 Poseidon of Cape Artemision
 Antikythera Ephebe
 Marathon Boy
 Charioteer of Delphi
 Hermes of Praxiteles
 Kroisos Kouros
 Kleobis and Biton
 Moscophoros
 Peplos Kore
 Statue of King Leonidas - Thermopylae
 Statue of Liberty (Mytilene)

Hong Kong 
 Statue of Queen Victoria at the entrance of Victoria Park 
 Statue of Sir Thomas Jackson at Statue Square
 Statue of King George VI at Hong Kong Zoological and Botanical Gardens

Lost statues in Hong Kong include:

 Statue of Edward VII - formerly at Statue Square
 Statue of Prince Albert - formerly at Statue Square

Hungary 
Heroes' Square, Heroes' Square (Hősök tere in Hungarian) is one of the major squares of Budapest, Hungary.
Anonymus, The statue of Anonymus, created by Miklós Ligeti in 1903, sits in front of Vajdahunyad Castle in Budapest's Városliget (City Park)
Statue Park, Szoborpark or Statue Park is a park in Budapest's XXII. district, with a gathering of monumental Soviet-era statues.
Liberty Statue, The Szabadság Szobor or Liberty Statue (sometimes Freedom Statue) in Budapest, Hungary, was first erected in 1947 in remembrance of the Soviet liberation of Hungary from Nazi forces during World War II.

India 

 Marjing Polo Statue, Imphal East, Manipur (world's tallest equestrian statue of a polo player) 
 Thiruvalluvar Statue, Kanyakumari, Tamil Nadu
 Shiva, Murudeshwara
 Gommateshwara statue, Shravanabelagola, Karnataka
 Statue of Ahimsa, Maharashtra
 Shri Bhaktha Anjaneyar, Vedasandur, Dindigul, Tamil Nadu
 Buddha Statue of Hyderabad, Husain Sagar, Hyderabad, Telangana
 Abhaya Buddha Statue in Eluru, Andhra Pradesh
 Dhyana Buddha Statue in Amaravathi
 Lord Hanuman statue, Namakkal, Tamilnadu.
 Statue of Equality (Ramanuja), Hyderabad, Telangana
 Statue of Unity, (world's tallest)
 Adiyogi Shiva statue, Coimbatore, Tamil Nadu
 Statue of Belief in Nathdwara, Rajasthan depicts lord Shiva
 Jakhoo Temple Hanuman Murti, Shimla, Himachal Pradesh

Indonesia 
 Christ Blessing, Manado
 Garuda Wisnu Kencana statue, Bali
 Jalesveva Jayamahe Monument, Surabaya
 Jesus Buntu Burake, Makale
 Patung Pemuda Membangun, Jakarta
 Patung Yesus Kristus, Mansinam Island
 Selamat Datang Monument, Jakarta
 West Irian Liberation Monument, Jakarta

Italy 
 Colossus of Barletta, statue of a Byzantine emperor
 Colossus of Nero
 Apollo Belvedere
 Laocoön and His Sons
 David (Donatello)
 Bacchus (Michelangelo)
 David (Michelangelo)
 The Deposition (Michelangelo)
 Cristo della Minerva
 Moses (Michelangelo)
 Pietà (Michelangelo)
 Rondanini Pietà
 David (Bernini)
 Aeneas, Anchises, and Ascanius
 Ecstasy of St Theresa
 Leonardo's horse, statue of a Horse in Milan based upon a design by Leonardo da Vinci from 500 years before.
 Statue :File:ColaDiRienzo.jpg of Cola di Rienzi by Girolamo Masini, erected in 1877 near the Campidoglio in Rome

Lebanon 
Our Lady of Lebanon, Harissa-Daraoun

Mexico 
El Ángel de la Independencia, Mexico City
Julio Cesar Chavez Gonzalez, Culiacan

Mongolia 
 Genghis Khan Equestrian Statue, Tuv aimag

Nicaragua 
Alexis Arguello, Managua
Jesús de la Misericordia, San Juan del Sur

Norway 
Frogner Park including the Vigeland installation, Oslo

Puerto Rico 
Sixto Escobar in Barceloneta, thought to be the first made for a professional boxer.

Russia 
Mother Motherland Is Calling
Bronze Horseman and other equestrian monuments to Russian tsars
Monument to Minin and Pozharsky on Red Square in Moscow
Worker and Kolkhoz Woman in Moscow
List of statues of Lenin
List of Mother Motherland statues

Senegal
African Renaissance Monument, 52 m high

Serbia

Pobednik in Kalemegdan
St. Sava by the Church of St. Sava
Emperor Dušan outside Palata pravde
Prince Mihailo Monument on the Republic Square

Sri Lanka 
 Maligawila Buddha statue in Maligawila, Monaragala District
 Avukana Buddha statue in Kekirawa, Anuradhapura District
 Three Buddha statues at Buduruvagala in Wellawaya, Monaragala District
 Samadhi Statue in Anuradhapura
 Toluvila statue in National Museum of Colombo
 Badulla Preaching Buddha in National Museum of Colombo
 Gal Vihara in Polonnaruwa
 Statue of Parakramabahu I in Polonnaruwa
 Sangiliyan Statue in Jaffna

Singapore 
 The Merlion statues at the Singapore River mouth and on Sentosa
 The Sir Stamford Raffles statue, based on the original by Thomas Woolner, located at the Victoria Concert Hall and at the Raffles Landing Site along Singapore River

South Africa 
 Horse Memorial, Port Elizabeth

Sweden
The Branting Monument in Stockholm.
Snowdrop (sculpture) at various locations in Sweden.

Turkey
Aphrodite of Cnidus, famous Hellenistic statue.
Aviation Martyrs' Monument in Istanbul
Monument of the Republic is located in Taksim Square, İstanbul
Statue of Humanity unfinished as of 2010

United Kingdom 
England

Angel of the North
Aspire
B of the Bang
Dream
Duke of York Column
Maiwand Lion
Nelson's Column
Statue of St Christopher, Norton Priory
Statue of Horatio Nelson, Birmingham
Wellington Statue
The Lincoln Imp

United States, including territories
Madonna of the Trail
National Monument to the U.S. Constitution
History of fountains in the United States

Alabama
Vulcan statue, Birmingham, Alabama World's tallest cast iron statue

Arkansas
Christ of the Ozarks statue, Eureka Springs

California

 Partners Statue, Disneyland

Florida
Partners Statue, Magic Kingdom, Walt Disney World Resort, Orlando, Florida

Illinois
Black Hawk Statue, Oregon
The Bowman and The Spearman, Chicago
Chicago Picasso, Chicago
Cloud Gate, Chicago
Flamingo, Chicago
Abraham Lincoln: The Head of State, Chicago
Miró's Chicago, Chicago
Nuclear Energy, Chicago
Standing Lincoln, Chicago
Forever Marilyn, Chicago

Indiana
Soldiers' and Sailors' Monument, Indianapolis
George Rogers Clark Memorial and statues of George Rogers Clark and Francis Vigo, Vincennes, Indiana

Massachusetts

The Hiker, Fall River
National Monument to the Forefathers, Plymouth
Prince Harry the Navigator, Fall River

Maryland
Washington Monument, Baltimore
Washington Monument, Boonsboro

Michigan
Cross in the Woods, Indian River
Fist of Joe Louis, Detroit
General George Armstrong Custer, Monroe
George Washington, Detroit
Sparty, East Lansing
The Spirit of Detroit, Detroit

Minnesota
Chisholm
Peanuts statues (Charlie Brown and Snoopy, Linus and Sally, Lucy and Schroeder, Peppermint Patty, and Marcy), St. Paul
Vision of Peace (Indian God of Peace), Saint Paul City Hall and Ramsey County Courthouse
Christopher Columbus, Minnesota State Capitol Grounds

Missouri
Liberty Memorial, Kansas City, several sculptors, including Robert Aitken and Edmond Amateis were involved.
Missouri State Capitol, Jefferson City, includes sculpture by Robert Aitken, James Earle Fraser, Karl Bitter, A.A. Weinman, Hermon Atkins MacNeil, Alexander Stirling Calder and Sherry Fry.

Montana 
James J. Hill statue, Havre, Montana
Our Lady of the Rockies statue, Butte, Montana

Nevada 
Burning Man effigy

New Jersey
 Tapomurti Shri Nilkanth Varni Murti at the Swaminarayan Akshardham (North America)

New York
Statue of Liberty (Liberty Enlightening the World), New York City

North Dakota
Enchanted Highway, a collection of the world's largest scrap metal sculptures
Tommy Turtle in Bottineau, North Dakota, the world's largest depicted turtle

Ohio

 Statues at Great American Ball Park by Tom Tsuchiya, Cincinnati
 King of Kings (destroyed by lightning strike and fire in 2010), near Monroe, Ohio
 Tyler Davidson Fountain, Cincinnati
 Statues at Hope Memorial Bridge, Cleveland
 Fountain of Eternal Life (also known as Peace Arising from the Flames of War), Cleveland

Oklahoma
 Pioneer Woman, Ponca City

Oregon
Oregon Pioneer, Salem
Portlandia, Portland

Pennsylvania
Joe Paterno statue, Beaver Stadium, State College (2001-2011)
Rocky statue, Philadelphia
Swann Memorial Fountain, Philadelphia, Alexander Stirling Calder

Puerto Rico
Columbus statue, Mayagüez
Monument to the Puerto Rican Countryman, Salinas

South Carolina
Statue of Strom Thurmond on the City Square, of his hometown, Edgefield, South Carolina

South Dakota
Crazy Horse Memorial - massive stone sculpture in the Black Hills, depicting the Lakota warrior 
Dignity - 50 foot statue of a Lakota woman in a star quilt, on a bluff above Chamberlain
Mount Rushmore - faces of four US presidents carved into the granite face of the mountain

Texas
Dallas Zoo's giraffe statue

Utah
This is the Place Monument at Heritage Park in Salt Lake City
Brigham Young Monument

Virginia
Marine Corps War Memorial, Rosslyn, Virginia

Washington
Fremont Troll, Seattle
Hammering Man, Seattle
The Lone Sailor, Bremerton
Statue of Lenin (Seattle)
Waiting for the Interurban, Seattle
 The Burghers of Calais and The Thinker by Rodin, at Maryhill Museum of Art near Goldendale, Washington

Washington, D.C.

Statue of Abraham Lincoln, inside the Lincoln Memorial
Statue of Thomas Jefferson, inside the Jefferson Memorial

Vietnam 
 Christ of Vung Tau, Bà Rịa–Vũng Tàu
 Notre-Dame de Tà Pao (Our Lady Tapao statue), Bình Thuận
 Buddha on Nirvana of Ta Cu, Bình Thuận

By distinction

Oldest
 Löwenmensch figurine

Tallest
Statue of Unity (depicts Vallabhbhai Patel); near Kevadiya, Gujarat, India. .  Completed 2018.
Lushan Dafo (depicts Vairocana Buddha); Lushan, Henan, China.  Buddha statue standing on a  lotus throne placed on a  pedestal/building. Completed 2002.
Ushiku Daibutsu (depicts Amitabha Buddha); Ushiku, Ibaraki Prefecture, Japan.  Buddha statue standing on a  lotus throne placed on a  pedestal/building. Completed 1995.
Guanyin statue of Hainan (depicts Avalokitesvara); Sanya, Hainan, China. . Completed in 2005.
Emperors Yan and Huang; Zhengzhou, China. . Completed 2007.
Sendai Daikannon (depicts Avalokitesvara); Sendai, Japan. .

Tallest and largest equestrian statue
 Marjing Polo Statue in Marjing Polo Complex, Imphal East, Manipur - , completed in 2022-23, is the world's tallest equestrian statue of a polo player
 Monument To Gral. José Gervasio Artigas In Minas, Uruguay - 18 meters tall, 9 meters long, weight 150,000 kilos 1974

Largest stone sculptures
 Great Sphinx of Giza

Metal sculptures
 At 54 m wide, the Angel of the North has the largest single dimension.
 The Statue of Liberty is the tallest at 46 m, atop a 47 m pedestal.
 The Enchanted Highway is a collection of the world's largest scrap metal sculptures.
 Vulcan statue, (17m) in Birmingham, Alabama, US, is the largest cast iron statue.

Other organizational lists
List of equestrian statues
List of tallest statues
List of the tallest statues in the United States
List of Roman domes
New Seven Wonders of the World
List of archaeological sites by country
List of colossal sculpture in situ
List of megalithic sites
List of archaeoastronomical sites by country
List of Egyptian pyramids
List of Mesoamerican pyramids
List of equestrian statues in Italy

Notes

References 

 
Statues
Statues